Major General Robert Edward Jackson,  (1 January 1886 – 24 November 1948) was an Australian railway engineer and a senior officer in the Australian Army during the Second World War.

References

|-

|-

1886 births
1948 deaths
Military personnel from Queensland
Australian Companions of the Distinguished Service Order
Australian Companions of the Order of St Michael and St George
Australian generals
Australian military personnel of World War I
Australian Army personnel of World War II
Chevaliers of the Légion d'honneur
Graduates of the Staff College, Camberley
People from the Darling Downs